was a Japanese Buddhist prelate during the Sengoku and early Edo Periods of Japanese history. He was a major figure in the Rinzai school of Zen Buddhism. Noted for his calligraphy, poetry, tea ceremony, he is also popularly credited with the invention of the takuan pickled radish.

Biography
Takuan Sōhō was born as the second son of Akiba Tsunanori, a samurai and senior retainer of the Yamana clan in the town of Izushi, in Tajima Province (present-day Toyooka, Hyōgo). When he was eight years old, the Yamana clan were defeated by the forces of Oda Nobunaga led by Hashiba Hideyoshi, making his father a ronin. In 1582 Takuan entered the temple of Shōen-ji in Izushi as an acolyte, and in 1586 he was sent to the temple of Sōkyō-ji, also in Izushi, to further studies. In 1591, Maeno Nagayasu, the lord of Izushi Castle during this period, invited Kaoru Sotada a disciple of Daitoku-ji's Shunoku Sōen to administer Sōkyō-ji and Takuan became his disciple. When Kaoru was transferred back to Daitoku-ji in 1594, Takuan accompanied him to Kyoto. There, he studied also directly under Shunoku Sōen at the temple of Sangen-in. In 1599, when Ishida Mitsunari built a memorial temple for his mother in Sawayama Castle, Shunoku and Takuan relocated to Sawayama and remained into the following year. However, after the fall of the castle subsequent to the Battle of Sekigahara and the death of Ishida Mitsunari, Takuan escaped. He was able to recover the body of the executed Ishida Mitsunari and assisted in his funeral services at Sangen-in in Kyoto. After his mentor, Kaoru Sotada died, Takuan relocated to Sakai in Izumi Province. He took the name of "Takuan" in 1604, having used a number of names up until this point as assigned by various of his teachers.

In 1607, Takuan returned to Daitoku-ji and in 1609 was appointed its 154th head abbot. However, he left after only a few days for a prolonged period of traveling, claiming that he neither sought nor wanted the responsibility. Throughout his journeys, Takuan raised and collected funds for the renovation of Daitoku-ji and other Zen temples. In 1620, he returned to his home town of Izushi where the temple of Sukyo-ji had recently been restored by the new daimyo of Izushi Domain, Koide Yoshihide.

Under the Tokugawa shogunate, the government imposed strict regulations on Buddhist temples, and in the case of influential temples such as Daitoku-ji, sought to weaken or break their relationship with the Imperial Court. In the case of Daitoku-ji in particular, it had been tradition that the priesthood was appointed by imperial decree, but now the shogunate declared that such appointments would need to be approved first by the Shogun in Edo. The shogunate promptly declared this action to be illegal and ordered the Kyoto Shoshidai to confiscate the robes. Takuan, together with the senior priesthood of Daitoku-ji and Myōshin-ji protested this action, and were arrested. They were tried for sedition at Edo Castle in front of Shogun Tokugawa Hidetada and Takuan was banished to Kaminoyama in Dewa Province. In 1632, after the death of Hidetada, a general amnesty was proclaimed. Takuan returned to Daitoku-ji and was received in an audience  arranged by Yagyū Munenori and Tenkai in Kyoto by Tokugawa Iemitsu, who was very much impressed by Takuan's intelligence and insights. At Iemitsu's invitation, he returned to Edo, were he gave many lectures to Iemitsu, who eventually rescinded the "Purple Robes decree" in 1641, restoring Daitoku-ji to its original honors. In the meantime, Iemitsu had the temple of Tōkai-ji constructed in Shinagawa at the outskirts of Edo in 1639 especially for Takuan, so that he could draw on Takuan's counsel at any time.

Takuan died in Edo in 1645. In the moments before his death, he wrote the kanji 夢 for ("dream"), and laid down his brush. He also left behind a will stating that a "tombstone must not be built" and that he should be buried without any ceremony in an unmarked grave. His disciples promptly erected gravestones at the temple of Tōkai-ji (東海寺) and also at the temple of Sukyō-ji (宗鏡寺) in Izushi. His grave at Tōkai-ji was proclaimed a National Historic Site in 1926.

Legacy

Takuan advised and befriended many people, from all social strata. Some of these included:
 Itō Ittōsai (Kenjutsu master, founder of the Ittō-ryū)
 Mikogami Tenzen (Kenjutsu master, successor of Itō Ittōsai)
 Yagyū Munenori (daimyō and kenjutsu master, head of Yagyū Shinkage-ryū style of swordsmanship) Takuan's writings to Lord Yagyū Munenori and Mikogami Tenzen are commonly studied by contemporary martial artists.
 Ishida Mitsunari (daimyō)
 Kuroda Nagamasa (Christian daimyō)
 Go-Mizunoo (abdicated Japanese Emperor)
 Tokugawa Iemitsu (shōgun)

Takuan remained largely unaffected by his popularity and famed reputation. Known for his acerbic wit and integrity of character, Takuan exerted himself to bring the spirit of Zen Buddhism to many and diverse aspects of Japanese culture, such as Japanese swordsmanship, gardening, sumi-e, shodo, and sado.

His collected writings total six volumes and over 100 published poems, including his best known treatise, The Unfettered Mind. His influence permeates the work of many present-day exponents of Zen Buddhism and martial arts. He has been credited with the invention of the yellow pickled daikon radish that carries the name "takuan".

Of the three essays included in The Unfettered Mind, two were letters
 Fudochishinmyoroku, "The Mysterious Record of Immovable Wisdom", written to Yagyū Munenori, head of the Yagyū Shinkage school of swordsmanship and teacher to two generations of shoguns.
 Taiaki, "Annals of the Sword Taia", written perhaps to Munenori or possibly to Ono Tadaaki, head of the Itto school of swordsmanship and an official instructor to the shogun's family and close retainers.

Takuan's morality has become the object of scathing criticism. Brian D. Victoria in "Zen at War" argues that Takuan is among the chief culprits of Zen Buddhism that created a religion unrecognizable as Buddhist. It is because Takuan repeatedly makes reference to the emptiness of opponents who may be murdered without consequence. Victoria understands Takuan to have transgressed the first grave Buddhist precept of 'Do not kill.'  This revisionist view is not uncontroversial.

Fictional appearances
He is featured as a character in Vagabond, a manga series, which is largely based on Eiji Yoshikawa's equally successful book, Musashi.

Director/writer Yoshiaki Kawajiri in his popular animated film Ninja Scroll created one of main characters Dakuan as a homage to Takuan Soho.

In director Hiroshi Inagaki's Samurai trilogy (Samurai I: Musashi Miyamoto, Samurai II: Duel at Ichijoji Temple and Samurai III: Duel at Ganryu Island), Takuan is played by Kuroemon Onoe and is portrayed as the mentor of Miyamoto Musashi.

References

External links
 "Takuan Soho"

Zen Buddhist abbots
Japanese religious leaders
Rinzai Buddhists
Japanese Zen Buddhists
1573 births
1645 deaths
Edo period Buddhist clergy
People from Hyōgo Prefecture